The Côtes-d'Armor, formerly known as Côtes-du-Nord, are a department in the north of Brittany, in northwestern France. In 2019, it had a population of 600,582.

History

Côtes-du-Nord was one of the original 83 departments created on 4 March 1790 following the French Revolution. It was made up from the near entirety of the ancient Pays de Saint-Brieuc, most of historical Trégor, the eastern half of Cornouaille, and the north-western part of the former diocese of Saint-Malo.

On February 27, 1990, the name was changed to Côtes-d'Armor: the French word côtes means "coasts" and ar mor is "the sea" in Breton. The name also recalls that of the Roman province of Armorica ("the coastal region").

Geography
Côtes-d'Armor is part of the current administrative region of Brittany and is bounded by the departments of 
Ille-et-Vilaine to the east, Morbihan to the south, and Finistère to the west, and by the English Channel to the north.

The region is an undulating plateau including three well-marked ranges of hills in the south. A granitoid chain, the Monts du Méné, starting in the south-east of the department runs in a north-westerly direction, forming the watershed between the rivers running respectively to the English Channel and the Atlantic Ocean. Towards its western extremity this chain bifurcates to form the Montagnes Noires in the south-west and the Monts d'Arrée in the west of the department. Off the coast, which is steep, rocky and much indented, are the Jentilez, Bréhat and other small islands. The principal bays are those of Saint-Malo and Saint-Brieuc.

Principal towns

The most populous commune is Saint-Brieuc, the prefecture. As of 2019, there are 6 communes with more than 10,000 inhabitants:

Demographics
The inhabitants of the department are known in French as Costarmoricains.

Politics

Côtes-d'Armor's long tradition of anti-clericalism, especially in the interior around Guingamp (a former Communist stronghold), has often led to the department's being seen as an area of left-wing exceptionalism in a region that historically was otherwise strongly Catholic and right-wing. The current president of the departmental council, Christian Coail, is a member of the Socialist Party.

Current National Assembly Representatives

Culture
The western part of the département is part of the traditionally Breton-speaking "Lower Brittany" (Breizh-Izel in Breton). The boundary runs from Plouha to Mûr-de-Bretagne. The Breton language has become an intense issue in many parts of Brittany, and many Breton-speakers advocate for bilingual schools. Gallo is also spoken in the east and is offered as a language in the schools and on the baccalaureat exams.

Gallery

Notable people
Anne Beaumanoir (b. 1923), one of the Righteous Among the Nations, was born in Guildo.
Bernadette Cattanéo (1899-1963), trade unionist and militant communist
English-born poet Robert William Service (1874–1958), known as the "Bard of the Yukon", is buried in Lancieux.

See also
Cantons of the Côtes-d'Armor department
Communes of the Côtes-d'Armor department
Arrondissements of the Côtes-d'Armor department

References

External links

  Prefecture website
  Departmental Council website

  
  Tourist board website

 
1790 establishments in France
Departments of Brittany
States and territories established in 1790